Armored group may refer to:

 Armored group (military unit), a unit type in the United States Army during World War II.
 Armored Group International, Inc., a security services company located in Los Angeles, California.
 The Armored Group LLC, a manufacturer of armored cash-in-transit vehicles located in Phoenix, Arizona.
 Armored Trunk Manufacturing Company, a manufacturer of steamer trunks and footlockers located in Los Angeles, California.